Alberto Beloki is a Basque pelota forward player, born in Burlada on 26 August 1978.
His brother Rubén Beloki is also a professional pelotari known as Beloki I, often considered one of the best in the history of the sport. 
The only major win recorded by Beloki II was the 2nd category Doubles-pelota championship in 2003.

References

Spanish pelotaris
1978 births
Living people
Pelotaris from Navarre
People from Cuenca de Pamplona